Anna Thea Madsen (born 27 October 1994) is a Danish badminton player.

Achievements

European Championships 
Women's singles

BWF International Challenge/Series 
Women singles

  BWF International Challenge tournament
  BWF International Series tournament
  BWF Future Series tournament

References

External links 
 

1994 births
Living people
People from Holbæk Municipality
Sportspeople from Copenhagen
Danish female badminton players
European Games competitors for Denmark
Badminton players at the 2015 European Games
21st-century Danish women